Synodontis bastiani is a species of upside-down catfish native to Côte d'Ivoire and Ghana where it occurs in the Sassandra, Bandama and Bia basins and the Comoe and Agnébi Rivers.  This species grows to a length of  SL.

References

External links 

bastiani
Catfish of Africa
Freshwater fish of West Africa
Fish described in 1948
Taxa named by Jacques Daget